Defending champion Justine Henin successfully defended her title, defeating Maria Sharapova in the final, 5–7, 7–5, 6–3 to win the singles tennis title at the 2007 WTA Tour Championships. The final lasted 3 hours and 23 minutes, becoming the longest best-of-three-sets final in WTA Tour history.

Jelena Janković, Ana Ivanovic, Anna Chakvetadze and Marion Bartoli (as an alternate replacing S. Williams) made their debuts at the event.

Seeds
 
Notes:
  Venus Williams had qualified but pulled out due to severe dizziness

Alternates

Draw

Finals

Yellow group
Standings are determined by: 1. number of wins; 2. number of matches; 3. in two-players-ties, head-to-head records; 4. in three-players-ties, percentage of sets won, or of games won; 5. steering-committee decision.

1 Serena Williams withdrew from the tournament after her first match (left patella femoral inflammation).

2 Bartoli's 6–0, 6–0 loss was the heaviest defeat in the tournament's history, and the only double bagel.

Red group
Standings are determined by: 1. number of wins; 2. number of matches; 3. in two-players-ties, head-to-head records; 4. in three-players-ties, percentage of sets won, or of games won; 5. steering-committee decision.

See also
WTA Tour Championships appearances

References

External links
 Main Draw

sin